is a manga series by Kazuki Takahashi that was adapted into three television anime series and several films. 

The original 1998 anime series was produced by Toei Animation and was broadcast in Japan from April 4, 1998 to October 10, 1998, running for 27 episodes. Yu-Gi-Oh! Duel Monsters was animated by Studio Gallop and ran for 224 episodes, premiering in Japan on April 18, 2000 and concluding on September 29, 2004. Finally, Yu-Gi-Oh! Capsule Monsters was an original miniseries commissioned by 4Kids Entertainment for broadcast in the United States, where it aired from September 9 to November 25, 2006.

Yu-Gi-Oh! (1998)

Yu-Gi-Oh! Duel Monsters

Series overview

Theme songs

Opening themes

The theme music for the U.S version was composed by Wayne Sharpe and John Siegler.

Ending themes

Season 1: Duelist Kingdom (2000–01)

Season 2: Rulers of the Duel (2001–02)

Season 3: Noah's Saga and Enter the Shadow Realm (2002–03)

Season 4: Waking the Dragons (2003)

Season 5: KC Grand Championship and Dawn of the Duel (2003–04)

Yu-Gi-Oh! Capsule Monsters

Movies

Notes

References

 NAS's official Yu-Gi-Oh! Duel Monsters site
 TV Tokyo's Yu-Gi-Oh! Duel Monsters site
 Toei's Yu-Gi-Oh! website

 
Yu-Gi-Oh!